Vincent Massey Public School can refer to:

Vincent Massey Public School (Toronto)
Vincent Massey Public School (Ottawa)
Vincent Massey Public School (Bowmanville)
Vincent Massey Public School (North Bay)
Vincent Massey Public School (Lively) Closed 1983